Ferencvárosi TC is a Hungarian women's and men's handball club, based in IX. district of Budapest, Hungary.

Women's team

European record
As of 22 November 2020:

EHF-organised seasonal competitions
Ferencváros women's team score listed first. As of 16 February 2023.

Record against other teams
Record against other teams in EHF organised competitions. Last updated on 16 February 2023.

Women's European Cup and Champions League

Women's EHF Cup

Women's Cup Winners' Cup
From the 2016–17 season, the women's competition was merged with the EHF Cup.

Women's Champions Trophy

Men's team

EHF-organised seasonal competitions
Ferencváros men's team score listed first. As of 30 August 2022

European League

Cup Winners' Cup
From the 2012–13 season, the men's competition was merged with the EHF Cup.

References

External links
 Official website
 Ferencvárosi TC (women's team) at eurohandball.com
 Ferencvárosi TC (men's team) at eurohandball.com

Hungarian handball clubs in European handball